Arctite (Na2Ca4(PO4)3F) is a colourless mineral found in the Kola Peninsula northern Russia. Its IMA symbol is Arc. It has a Mohs hardness of 5 and has a specific gravity of 3.13. Arctite is transparent with a vitreous lustre. Arctite has a perfect cleavage and a trigonal crystal system. It is also a naturally occurring antiperovskite.

Common associates of arctite include aegirine, natisite, lomonosovite, umbite and thenardite.

References 

Webmineral data

Phosphate minerals
Trigonal minerals
Minerals in space group 166